Mark E. Huizenga is a Republican member of the Michigan Senate for the 30th district - Elected November 8, 2022.  Mark is a member of the Republican leadership team and serves as Assistant Whip.  He previously served in the Michigan Senate for the 28th District - Elected November 2, 2021.  Mark previously served as a member of the Michigan House of Representatives District 74 Elected November 2018, and re-elected in 2020.  

Huizenga owns Mark Huizenga Systems Consulting, a health care consulting firm. Huizenga is also the managing partner for Key Green Solutions, a sustainability management software company.

Huizenga previously served the City of Walker as mayor from 2013 to 2018, as a city commissioner from 2011 to 2013 and the City Planning Commission from 2005 to 2011.

References

External links 
 Mark Huizenga at gophouse.org
  Key Green Solutions
  Mark Huizenga Systems Consulting

Living people
Calvin University alumni
Aquinas College (Michigan) alumni
Republican Party members of the Michigan House of Representatives
Mayors of places in Michigan
21st-century American politicians
Year of birth missing (living people)